Gulagu.net (rus. Гулагу-нет, "No more GULAG!") is a Russian anti-corruption, anti-torture human rights organization and website. It was founded in 2011 by Russian human rights activist Vladimir Osechkin.

Gulagu.net has published videos of beatings and torture in Russian prisons.

In 2023, Gulagu.net helped Andrey Medvedev flee Russia to seek asylum in Norway.

References

External links

Russian websites
Russian-language websites
Human rights organizations based in Russia
Human rights organizations based in France